The Helpmann Award for Best Comedy Performer is an award, presented by Live Performance Australia (LPA) at the annual Helpmann Awards since 2006.

Winners and nominees

 Source:

References

External links
 

C
Australian comedy awards